The Stanhope essay prize was an undergraduate history essay prize created at Balliol College, Oxford, by Philip Henry Stanhope, 5th Earl Stanhope in 1855.

Notable winners
Notable Stanhope Prize winners:

 John Richard Magrath, 1860 
 Francis Jeune, 1863, 1st Baron St Helier
 Thomas Pitt Taswell-Langmead, 1866
 Thomas Buchanan, 1868, Liberal politician 
 Arthur Francis Leach, 1872
 Richard Lodge, 1875
 Charles Harding Firth, 1877, British historian
 Arthur Elam Haigh, 1878 
 Holden Hutton, 1881
John Bruce Williamson, 1883, barrister, historian and writer
 William Carr, 1884, biographer
 Owen Morgan Edwards, 1886
 George Arnold Wood, 1889, English Australian historian
 John Buchan, 1897, British novelist
 Robert Rait, 1899
 Robert Howard Hodgkin was proxime
 Alfred Eckhard Zimmern, 1902, New College, Oxford, British classical scholar and historian
 Archibald Main, 1903
 George Stuart Gordon, 1905
 Vivian Hunter Galbraith, 1911, English historian
 Michael Sadleir, 1912 
 Aldous Huxley, 1916, English writer
 Bruce McFarlane, 1924
 Bernard Miller, 1925, British businessman
 Maurice Ashley, editor of The Listener
 Derek Pattinson, 1951, Secretary-General of the General Synod of the Church of England

In fiction
In Max Beerbohm's satirical tragedy of undergraduate life at Oxford, Zuleika Dobson (1911), the hero Duke of Dorset was awarded, amongst others, the Stanhope:

References

Awards and prizes of the University of Oxford
Lists of people associated with the University of Oxford
History awards
Awards established in 1855